Medius nepali is a moth of the family Erebidae first described by Michael Fibiger in 2011. It is found in Nepal (it was described from north-western Pokhara).

The wingspan is 13–14 mm. The forewings are long and narrow, with a rounded apex. The ground colour is beige suffused with brown scales in the subterminal and terminal areas. There are dark-brown patches at the base of the costa and at the upper quadrangular medial area. The hindwing ground colour is grey with a discal spot.

References

Micronoctuini
Taxa named by Michael Fibiger
Moths described in 2011